Anoista is a genus of moths of the family Yponomeutidae.

Species
Anoista insolita - Turner, 1938 

Yponomeutidae